Kohler Mira Ltd is a plumbing company based in Cheltenham, Gloucestershire known for its brand of Mira showers.

History

Walker Crosweller
Walker, Crosweller and Co. Ltd. was founded in London in 1921 by James MacFarlane Walker. 

In 1933, the company also made gas and air flow, pressure and vacuum recorders (instrumentation) for industry. These were made by the Arkon Instruments subsidiary. In 1936, it launched the Leonard thermostatic mixing valves; this was world's first thermostatic shower. In 1937, it moved to Cheltenham, known as the Whaddon Works. 

In the Second World War, all shower valves for British military use were made by them. By 1950 the Leonard brand of shower equipment was becoming the main brand used for institutional buildings – schools and hospitals. This was due to persuading the Ministry of Education to install temperature regulated showers. The thermostatic mixing valves were not just used for showers but for general heating of water, including their thermostatic steam water heaters.

In 1956 they introduced the Unatap range of spray mixing taps. These were used to save water – thought to be 5,500 gallons of hot water per washroom per year. They were developed in conjunction with the Building Research Establishment.

Public company
On Thursday 24 August 1961, the company was floated on the London Stock Exchange with a share price of 8s 6d. The previous year the company had made £88,000 profit. The company chairman was Mr J.M. Walker.

In November 1961, it introduced the Leonard 72 thermostatic mixing valve, which controlled water temperature as well as flow.

Mira
On 27 June 1963, the company took over the Miraflo Ltd company, and it became a subsidiary. Miraflo made shower mixing taps. In December 1963 Richard Walker became chairman, following the death of his father. He was also the managing director. From 1966–67, he was the President of the British Valve Manufacturers Association (now the British Valve and Actuator Association). 

In November 1967, the company formed the subsidiary Richard Fife Inc. to market its products in the United States. It would also have subsidiaries in Germany, South Africa, Belgium, and Canada. In April 1968, it began television adverts – the first time showers had been advertised on British television. By 1968, it was selling Kelta shower fittings.

By 1970 turnover had reached £2 million, and it exported to 37 countries. From 1971–72, Richard Walker was President of the Comité Européen de l'Industrie de la Robinetterie (now known as CEIR). In 1972–73, the company made a 90% increase in profits to £328,000, and Richard Walker had been made OBE.

Takeover
In April 1974 the company was bought out and left the LSE. The managing director was Dennis Arbon, until 1980.

In 1976, it launched the Miralec brand of shower with temperature stabilisation. Mira Thermostatic replaced the Leonard brand. In 1978, it launched its first instant electric shower. In 1979, the Rada brand was introduced to sell the Mira showers in export markets. In 1981 it introduced a thermoscopic electric shower for the domestic market.

In 1986, the company name changed to Caradon Mira Ltd. In 1988, the Miralec brand became Mira. On 3 October 1989, MB Group (former Metal Box) bought Caradon plc for £337 million, and the company became MB-Caradon plc. In 1995 it introduced its first thermostatic electric shower. Caradon Plumbing Solutions, part of Novar, was bought by HSBC Private Equity on 9 October 2000 for £442 million. In December 2000, Richard Walker died.

Kohler
On 19 July 2001, Mira Showers and Alstone Shower Cubicles were bought from HSBC Private Equity by Kohler Company for £301 million. The bathroom division, Twyford Bathrooms, had been sold to the Sanitec Group (a Finnish company) in January 2001 for £84 million.

Products
Kohler Mira UK Ltd currently comprises three main brands: Kohler UK, Mira Showers and Rada. Each brand offers its own range of products:

Kohler UK
Products include bathroom suites, washbasins, taps, toilets, bathroom furniture, shower enclosures and showers.

Mira Showers
Products include taps, mixer showers, digital showers, electric showers, shower trays and shower enclosures, parts and accessories.

Rada
As the commercial division of Kohler Mira Ltd, Rada products include taps, showers, mixing valves, flushing valves and emergency showering solutions for healthcare, education and sports and leisure industries.

Structure
The factory is situated between Cromwell Road and Clyde Crescent in Cheltenham, to the east of the Whaddon Road football ground (it sponsors the club), in the middle of a residential area. The GCHQ site at Oakley was nearby to the east but has since been demolished and replaced by a large housing estate.

See also
 Spirax-Sarco Engineering – also based in Cheltenham

References

External links
 Kohler Mira
 Kohler bathrooms
 Rada controls
 Mira showers

Video clips
 Kohler Mira YouTube channel

News items
 Sponsoring Cheltenham Town in March 2010
 Cheltenham spa up and running in 2005
 Restoring Cheltenham's spa in July 2004

Kohler Company
Cheltenham Town F.C.
Companies established in 2001
Bathroom fixture companies
Companies based in Cheltenham
2001 establishments in England